Robert Kahn may refer to:
 Robert Kahn (composer) (1865–1951), composer and music teacher
 Robert Louis Kahn (1918–2019), psychologist and social scientist
 Robert Ludwig Kahn (1923–1970), professor of German studies and poet
 Bob Kahn (born 1938), Internet pioneer
 Robert Kahn, more famous as Bob Kane, the creator of the comic book superhero Batman